Dasineura balsamicola are a species of midges in the family Cecidomyiidae. They are an inquiline of Paradiplosis tumifex.

References

Cecidomyiinae